The Geneva Chamber Orchestra (L'OCG, L'Orchestre de chambre de Genève), is a Swiss professional orchestra based in Geneva. It was founded in 1958.

References

Swiss orchestras
1958 establishments in Switzerland
Musical groups established in 1958
Culture in Geneva